Fairview, North Carolina may refer to :

 Fairview, Buncombe County, North Carolina, a census-designated place in Buncombe County, North Carolina
 Fairview, Union County, North Carolina, an incorporated town in Union County, North Carolina